Jack Dinatale (born 12 December 1958) is  a former Australian rules footballer who played with Footscray in the Victorian Football League (VFL).

Notes

External links 
		

Living people
1958 births
Australian rules footballers from Victoria (Australia)
Western Bulldogs players
Spotswood Football Club players